Suzhou City Stadium is a multi-use stadium in Suzhou, China. Built in 1918, it is one of the oldest stadiums in Suzhou. It is currently used mostly for football matches.  The stadium holds 35,000 people.

References

Football venues in China
Sports venues in Suzhou
Sports venues completed in 1918